Microascus is a genus of fungi in the family Microascaceae.

References

External links
Index Fungorum

Microascales